The Football NSW 2021 season was the ninth season of football in New South Wales under the banner of the National Premier Leagues. The competition consists of four divisions across the state of New South Wales.

All competitions under Football NSW were cancelled on the 12th of August 2021 midway through the season due to the Covid-19 lockdown restrictions

Competitions

2021 National Premier League NSW Men's 1
The season was cancelled on 12 August, due to on-going lockdowns associated with the COVID-19 pandemic in Australia, with no Premier declared, and with promotion and relegation suspended until the following season.

League table

2021 National Premier League NSW Men's 2

League Table

2021 National Premier League NSW Men's 3

League Table

2021 National Premier League NSW Men's 4

League Table

References

National Premier Leagues